Naogaon-3 is a constituency represented in the Jatiya Sangsad (National Parliament) of Bangladesh since 2014 by Salim Uddin Tarafder, of the Awami League since 2018.

Boundaries 
The constituency encompasses Badalgachhi and Mahadebpur upazilas.

History 
The constituency was created in 1984 from a Rajshahi constituency when the former Rajshahi District was split into four districts: Nawabganj, Naogaon, Rajshahi, and Natore.

Members of Parliament

Elections

Elections in the 2010s

Elections in the 2000s

Elections in the 1990s

References

External links
 

Parliamentary constituencies in Bangladesh
Naogaon District